Shorea isoptera is a species of plant in the family Dipterocarpaceae. It is a tree endemic to Borneo.

References

isoptera
Endemic flora of Borneo
Trees of Borneo
Taxonomy articles created by Polbot